Tamer Güney (6 January 1936 – 22 August 2020) was a Turkish football player and manager who played as a midfielder.

References

1936 births
2020 deaths
People from Bilecik
Turkish footballers
Association football midfielders
MKE Ankaragücü footballers
Turkish football managers
Türk Telekom GSK managers
Orduspor managers
Kayseri Erciyesspor managers
Adanaspor managers
Eskişehirspor managers
MKE Ankaragücü managers
Diyarbakırspor managers
Kayserispor managers
Gaziantepspor managers
Fenerbahçe football managers